Eduard Vasilievich Nazarov (23 November 1941 – 11 September 2016) was a Soviet and Russian animator, screenwriter, voice actor, book illustrator and educator, artistic director at the Pilot Studio (2007–2016), vice-president of ASIFA (1987–1999) and a co-president of the KROK International Animated Films Festival. He was awarded People's Artist of Russia in 2012.

Biography
Eduard Nazarov was born in a bomb shelter during the Battle of Moscow. His parents were Russian engineers who met at the end of 1930s while studying at Moscow institutes. Nazarov's ancestors came from the Bryansk Oblast and had a peasant background. He became engaged in painting since childhood and while in the 9th grade entered an art school where he got acquainted with Yuri Norstein, his close friend since.

After three years in the Soviet Army, Nazarov entered Stroganov Institute. Simultaneously, he started working at Soyuzmultfilm in 1959 as an apprentice, self-educating, since he was too late for the animation courses. He worked as an artist-renderer, an art director's assistant under Mikhail Tsekhanovsky and as an art director under Fyodor Khitruk, most famously creating Winnie-the-Pooh for the Soviet adaptation of the fairy tale.

Since 1973 he had been directing his own short films, often combining duties of an art director, screenwriter and voice actor. Once Upon a Dog is generally considered his most prominent work; it was awarded the First Prize at the 1983 Odense International Film Festival and a Special Jury Award at the 1983 Annecy International Animated Film Festival. During the 2012 Open Russian Festival of Animated Film ceremony dedicated to 100 years of national animation the film headed the "Golden Hundred" list of the best national animated films. It also appeared at the 65th place of the Top 150 Japanese and World Animation list at the 2003 Laputa Animation Festival in Tokyo.

Between 1979 and 2000 Nazarov had been working at the High Courses for Scriptwriters and Film Directors as an educator. He also illustrated various books and magazines.

His last film Martynko (1987) was made during perestroika and banned for four years because Nazarov refused to change the name of the cartoon princess Raisa. Censors saw her as a satire on the First Lady of the Soviet Union Raisa Gorbacheva despite all characters were borrowed directly from the fairy tale of the same name by Boris Shergin. Around the same time, Nazarov left Soyuzmultfilm, stating that it turned into "something between an isolation ward full of choking gas and a Cancer Ward".

In 1988, he was awarded the Vasilyev Brothers State Prize of the RSFSR. Between 1987 and 1999 he served as a vice-president of ASIFA.

During the 1990s, he directed commercials and hosted a number of television shows dedicated to Russian and world animation. In 1991, he became a co-president of the KROK International Animated Films Festival, along with David Cherkassky. In 1993, he co-founded the SHAR animation school-studio along with Andrei Khrzhanovsky, Yuri Norstein and Fyodor Khitruk where he worked until his death.

In 2004 Nazarov joined the Pilot Studio in their Mountain of Gems project, a grand government-backed TV series that combined efforts of many animators; between 2004 and 2015 they produced around seventy 13-minute shorts based on various traditional fairy tales of different Russian and former Soviet regions. In addition to art direction, Nazarov also co-wrote screenplays and did voice-overs to some of them. After the sudden death of Alexander Tatarsky in 2007 he turned into an artistic director of the studio.

Nazarov suffered from diabetes for many years and had to undergo surgery late in his life, losing one of the legs. He continued teaching students through Skype.

Eduard Nazarov died on 11 September 2016 and was buried at the Vagankovo Cemetery in Moscow. He was survived by his wife Tatiana.

Selected filmography

Boniface's Holiday (1965) – animator
Passion of Spies (1967) – voice actor (all characters, uncredited)
Film, Film, Film (1968) – assistant art director
Zigzag of Success (1968) – animator (animated sequences)
Winnie-the-Pooh (1969) – art director
Winnie-the-Pooh Pays a Visit (1971) – art director
Winnie-the-Pooh and a Busy Day (1972) – art director
Island (1973) – art director
A Princess and a Cannibal (1977) – director, screenwriter
Ograblenie po... (1978) – voice actor (all characters, uncredited)
Hunt (1979) – director, screenwriter
Adventures of Captain Wrongel (1979) – voice actor (Black Cattlefish captain)
Once Upon a Dog (1982) – director, screenwriter, voice actor (narrator)
Ant Adventure (1983) – director, screenwriter, art director, voice actor (various)
About Sidorov Vova (1985) – director, screenwriter, art director
Martynko (1987) – director, screenwriter, voice actor (tsar, narrator)
Gagarin (1994) – artistic director
Mountain of Gems (2004–2015) – artistic director, director (3 episodes), screenwriter (5 episodes), voice actor (various)
Masha and the Bear (2009–2010) – voice actor (Father Frost)

References

Sources
 
 Eduard Nazarov at Animator.ru

1941 births
2016 deaths
Russian animated film directors
Russian children's book illustrators
Academic staff of High Courses for Scriptwriters and Film Directors
People's Artists of Russia
Recipients of the Vasilyev Brothers State Prize of the RSFSR
Russian animators
Russian illustrators
Russian male voice actors
20th-century Russian screenwriters
Male screenwriters
20th-century Russian male writers
Soviet animation directors
Soviet animators
Soviet male voice actors
Soviet screenwriters
Stroganov Moscow State Academy of Arts and Industry alumni